Megalodon is an extinct species of giant shark.

Megalodon may also refer to:

Biology 
 Megalodon (bivalve), a genus of fossil bivalves
 Brachysuchus megalodon, a phytosaur
 Schistura megalodon, a stone loach; see Schistura

Entertainment 
 Megalodon (2004 film), a 2004 action film
 Megalodon (2018 film), an action horror television film broadcast by Horror Channel
 Shark Attack 3: Megalodon, a 2003 monster film
 Megalodon: The Monster Shark Lives, a 2013 Discovery Channel mockumentary
 Megalodon Collective, Norwegian jazz group
 "Megalodon", a song on the Mastodon album Leviathan

Other uses 
 A make of modern scuba diving rebreather
 Megalodon (website), a web archive site

See also 

 Meg (disambiguation)
 Megalodonta, a genus of daisies
 Megalodontesidae, a family of sawflies
 Megalodontes, a genus within the family
 Megalodontidae, an extinct family of bivalve molluscs